Rudnik is a village in the administrative district of Gmina Brody, within Starachowice County, Świętokrzyskie Voivodeship, in south-central Poland.

The village has a population of 373.

References

Rudnik